is a Japanese football player. He plays for FC Ryukyu from 2023.

Career
Sho Iwamoto joined J1 League club Gamba Osaka in 2017.

Iwamoto joined to J3 relegated club, FC Ryukyu from 2023 season.

Career statistics

 Club performance

Updated: start from 2023 season

Reserves performance

Last Updated: 9 December 2017

References

External links

2001 births
Living people
Association football people from Kanagawa Prefecture
Japanese footballers
J1 League players
J3 League players
Gamba Osaka players
Gamba Osaka U-23 players
FC Ryukyu players
Association football midfielders